Jeffrey Bruce Symonds (born October 1, 1985) is a Canadian professional triathlete. His third-place in the 2011 Ironman 70.3 World Championship made him the first Canadian male and the second man in his twenties (after Terenzo Bozzone) to record a podium finish at the Ironman 70.3 World Championships. Symonds won the 2015 Ironman Asia-Pacific Championship in Melbourne, and the 2013 and 2014 Challenge Penticton triathlons, with second-place finishes at Ironman Canada in 2014 and 2018.

Symonds trains in his hometown of Penticton, British Columbia and Vancouver, British Columbia

Early life 
Symonds was born and raised in Penticton, British Columbia. As he was growing up, he enjoyed playing school sports like basketball and hockey. This was around the time when he got immersed in triathlon due to the popular Ironman Canada race being held in his hometown. In 2005, Symonds participated in his first triathlon race. From that point on, he realized that he wanted to compete professionally.

Career 
Even though Symonds did not start participating in triathlons until he was 20, he was a runner for the University of British Columbia in college, where he obtained a bachelor's degree in commerce, with a concentration in marketing.

Notable results 
 2018 Ironman Canada (Whistler) - 2nd
 2015 Ironman Asia-Pacific Championship Melbourne - 1st - 2:44 marathon
 2014 Challenge Penticton – 1st - 3 weeks after Ironman Canada (Whistler) - 2:50 marathon
 2014 Challenge Bahrain - 7th 
 2014 Ironman Canada (Whistler) – 2nd - 2:40:34 marathon
 2013 Challenge Penticton – 1st - bike crash going 60+km/h - 2:47 marathon
 2013 Ironman Los Cabos – 4th - debut Ironman distance race - 2:54 marathon
 2012 Ironman 70.3 Austin – 4th
 2012 Ironman 70.3 World Championship – 15th
 2012 Ironman 70.3 Calgary – 3rd
 2011 Ironman 70.3 World Championship – 3rd
 2011 Ironman 70.3 Boise – 3rd
 2011 Ironman 70.3 Lake Stevens – 3rd
 2010 Ironman 70.3 World Championship – 10th
 2010 Ironman 70.3 Lake Stevens – 2nd
 2009 Ironman 70.3 World Championship – 33rd
 2011 - 2014 Great White North Triathlon - 1st - new course record set in 2013 at 3:46:01

References

External links 
 

1985 births
Living people
Canadian male triathletes
UBC Sauder School of Business alumni
21st-century Canadian people